Jeffrey Michael Nielsen (born September 20, 1971) is an American former professional ice hockey player who played in the National Hockey League (NHL) with the New York Rangers, Mighty Ducks of Anaheim, and Minnesota Wild. He is the older brother of Kirk Nielsen.

Playing career
A highly touted prospect while in high school, Nielsen was drafted by the New York Rangers in the fourth round, 69th overall in the 1990 NHL Entry Draft. After being drafted, Nielsen choose to play in the college ranks and played for the University of Minnesota for four years. He gradually improved each year and led the team in points during his senior season (1993–94) and earned a spot on the WCHA second All-Star team the same season.

After college Nielsen joined the Rangers minor league affiliate Binghamton Rangers. He played three years with Binghamton, most notably scoring 53 points in 76 games during the 1996–97 season. That year he also made his NHL debut, appearing in two games with the New York Rangers.

Nielsen then signed with the Mighty Ducks of Anaheim. He split the 1997–98 season between the Mighty Ducks and their minor league affiliate Cincinnati Mighty Ducks. For the 1998–99 season Nielsen was able to crack the Anaheim starting lineup, playing 80 games and scoring 9 points. The 1999–2000 season saw Nielsen play in 79 games and score an NHL career high 18 points.

Nielsen was claimed in the 2000 NHL Expansion Draft by the Minnesota Wild. He played one season with the Wild before retiring from hockey in 2001.

Career statistics

Regular season and playoffs

International

Awards and honors

References

External links
 

1971 births
Living people
American men's ice hockey right wingers
Binghamton Rangers players
Cincinnati Mighty Ducks players
Ice hockey players from Minnesota
Mighty Ducks of Anaheim players
Minnesota Golden Gophers men's ice hockey players
Minnesota Wild players
New York Rangers draft picks
New York Rangers players
Sportspeople from Grand Rapids, Minnesota